The NK-8 was a low-bypass turbofan engine built by the Kuznetsov Design Bureau, in the  thrust class.  It powered production models of the Ilyushin Il-62 and the Tupolev Tu-154A and B models.

Variants
NK-8-2  (Tupolev Tu-154)
NK-8-2U  (Tupolev Tu-154)
NK-8-4  (Ilyushin Il-62)

Applications
Ilyushin Il-62
Tupolev Tu-154

Specifications (NK-8-2)

See also

References

External links

 NK-8 on LeteckeMotory.cz - NK-8 (cs)

Low-bypass turbofan engines
1960s turbofan engines
Kuznetsov aircraft engines